Cynoglossus suyeni, also known as the Suyen's Tongue Sole, is a species of tonguefish. It is indigenous to the Indo-West Pacific region, found along the coast of the Philippines through Celebes, to the Timor Sea and less common off Taiwan.

References

Cynoglossidae
Fish described in 1934